The Duryea brothers, Charles Duryea (December 15, 1861 – September 28, 1938) and J. Frank Duryea (October 8, 1869 – February 15, 1967) were early pioneers in the automobile industry. The brothers grew up in the town of Wyoming, Illinois. Together, they invented the first gasoline-powered automobile in America.

Main articles
Charles Duryea
J. Frank Duryea

See also

 Duryea Motor Wagon Company
 Duryea Power
 Duryea Motor Wagon
 Stevens-Duryea
 Sylph (bicycle brand)

References

Sibling duos
Duryea
American automotive pioneers
People from Wyoming, Illinois